Springfield Township may be any of these places in the U.S. state of Ohio:

Springfield Township, Clark County, Ohio
Springfield Township, Gallia County, Ohio
Springfield Township, Hamilton County, Ohio
Springfield Township, Jefferson County, Ohio
Springfield Township, Lucas County, Ohio
Springfield Township, Mahoning County, Ohio
Springfield Township, Muskingum County, Ohio
Springfield Township, Richland County, Ohio
Springfield Township, Ross County, Ohio
Springfield Township, Summit County, Ohio
Springfield Township, Williams County, Ohio

See also
Springfield, Ohio, a city in Clark County

Ohio township disambiguation pages